The Camargue horse is an ancient breed of horse indigenous to the Camargue area in southern France.  Its origins remain relatively unknown, although it is generally considered one of the oldest breeds of horses in the world. For centuries, possibly thousands of years, these small horses have lived wild in the harsh environment of the Camargue marshes and wetlands of the Rhône delta, which covers part of the départements of Gard and Bouches-du-Rhône.  There they developed the stamina, hardiness and agility for which they are known today.   Traditionally, they live in semi-feral conditions in the marshy land of the region. The Camargue horse is the traditional mount of the gardians, the Camargue "cowboys" who herd the black Camargue bulls used for "courses camarguaises" in southern France. Camargue horses galloping through water is a popular and romantic image of the region.

Characteristics

Camargue horses are always gray.  This means that they have black skin underlying a white hair coat as adult horses.  They are born with a hair coat that is black or dark brown in colour, but as they grow to adulthood, their hair coat becomes ever more intermingled with white hairs until it is completely white.  They are small horses, generally standing  at the withers, and weighing . Despite their small size, they have the strength to carry grown adults. Considered rugged and intelligent, they have a short neck, deep chest, compact body, well-jointed, strong limbs and a full mane and tail.

The head has many similarities to the Barb horse. It is often heavy, square and expressive, with bright, wide-set eyes, a straight profile, flat forehead and well-chiseled cheek bones. The ears are small, short, and set well apart. The forelock is full.  The breed has a neck of medium length with an abundant mane.  The chest is deep and wide, and the shoulder is powerful and muscular. The withers must be defined but not exaggerated. The Camargue horse has a medium length back, well-supported,  and a slightly sloping full croup, well-muscled hindquarters, and a low set, full tail.  The Camargue horse has long legs which are well proportioned, strong and resistant, with large knees and hocks. Their hooves are hard and tough, with soles that are large and wide, suited to its original marshy habitat.

Registration
Since 2003, three registration categories exist to identify Camargue horses:
Camargue Horses registered in the stud book, foaled and identified in Camargue area, branded before weaning, and from a manade (a small, semi-feral herd structure). The berceau or cradle of the breed is strictly defined, and consists of 45 communes in the départements of Bouches-du-Rhône, Gard and Hérault.
Camargue hors manade  Horses registered in the stud book, foaled and identified in Camargue area, and not from a manade.
Camargue hors berceau Horses registered in the stud book, foaled and identified outside of the Camargue area.

There exists a strong sense of regionalism in Camargue area, so registration for the horses is treated similarly to an Appellation d'origine contrôlée.

The "Cavallo del Delta" 
The Camargue horse was introduced in the 1970s to the Po delta in Italy, where under the name "Cavallo del Delta" it is treated as an indigenous breed. In 2011 the registered population numbered 163.

Terminology
There is a specific terminology in the Provençal dialect that is used when discussing Camargue horses:

History

Some researchers believe the Camargue are descended from the ancient Solutré horse hunted during the Upper Paleolithic period. Extensive archeological evidence has been found in the present-day Burgundy region of France. The Camargue breed was appreciated by the Celtic and Roman invaders who entered the Iberian Peninsula. Their genealogy is closely tied with Iberian horses, especially those of the northern part of the peninsula. The original Spanish jaca was probably a cross between the Celtic pony and the Camargue. It was later improved by crosses with northern European horse types and ultimately with the southern peninsular horse, as the Moors spread their influence toward the Pyrenees.

As a result, the Camargue genes probably penetrated the Americas through the influence of the jaca, the warhorse taken to new lands where hardiness was a requirement. Breeds such as the Chilean horse and Criollo show signs of some characteristics that are common in the Camargue breed. Camargue horses were used on a large scale during the construction of the Suez Canal in the 1860s.

In 1976, to preserve the standards and purity of the breed, the French government set breed standards and started registering the main breeders of the Camargue horse.  In 1978, they set up the breed stud book.  To be registered, foals must be born out of doors and must be seen to suckle from a registered mare as proof of parentage.  Foals born inside the defined Camargue region are registered , while those born elsewhere are registered  ("outside the cradle" or "birthplace"). They have the heavy, square heads of primitive horses, but the influence of Arabian, Barb and Thoroughbred blood can also be seen. The gardians look after the horses, which are rounded up annually for health inspections, branding, and gelding of unsuitable stock.

In England, the only breeding herd is at Valley Farm, in Wickham Market, near Woodbridge, Suffolk. Valley Farm is also the home of the British Camargue Horse Society, which represents the Camargue Breed in Britain by maintaining a stud book for British-bred Camargue Horses and registering ownership of Camargue Horses in Britain.

Uses

The Camargue horse is the traditional mount of the gardian. It is used for livestock management, particularly of Camargue cattle, and also in competitive Camargue equitation, in traditional activities such as the abrivado preceding the course camarguaise, and in many gardian games.

Their calm temperament, agility, intelligence and stamina has resulted in these horses being used for equestrian games, dressage, and long-distance riding, which is growing in popularity in France.

Film portrayal
The 1953 children's film Crin-Blanc, English title White Mane, portrayed the horses and the region. A short black-and-white film directed by Albert Lamorisse, director of Le ballon rouge (1956), Crin-blanc won the 1953 Prix Jean Vigo and the short film Grand Prix at the 1953 Cannes Film Festival, as well as awards at Warsaw and Rome. In 1960 Denys Colomb Daunant, writer and actor for Crin-blanc, made the documentary Le Songe des Chevaux Sauvages, "Dream of the Wild Horses". It featured Camargue horses and slow motion photography, and won the Small Golden Berlin Bear at the 1960 Berlin International Film Festival.

See also 
 List of horse breeds
 Manade

References

External links

 Le Cheval Camargue 

Horse breeds originating in France
Horse breeds
Camargue